The following is an episode list for the Australian drama A Country Practice on Seven Network. From 18 November 1981 to 22 November 1993, a total of 1058 original episodes of A Country Practice aired over its thirteen-season run.  Some of the show's episode titles are used more than once during the series' run.  After its cancellation by Seven, A Country Practice was picked up by Network Ten and between April and November 1994, 30 more episodes aired taking the total episode count to 1088.

Series overview

Episode list

Season 1 (1981)

Season 2 (1982)

Season 3 (1983)

Season 4 (1984)

Season 5 (1985)

Season 6 (1986)

Season 7 (1987)

Season 8 (1988)

Season 9 (1989)

Season 10 (1990)

Season 11 (1991)

Season 12 (1992)

Season 13 (1993)

Season 14 (1994)

References

Lists of Australian drama television series episodes